David John Green (born 5 March 1942) is an English jazz bassist.

Background 
Green's first public performances were with his childhood friend Charlie Watts in the late 1950s. While performing with Humphrey Lyttelton from 1963 to 1983, Green also played with the Don Rendell–Ian Carr band in the early 1960s, and went on to play with Stan Tracey. In the early 1980s, Green led his own group, Fingers, featuring Lol Coxhill, Bruce Turner and Michael Garrick. Green regularly backed visiting American stars at Ronnie Scott's Jazz Club, including Coleman Hawkins, Ben Webster, Roland Kirk and Sonny Rollins. Green has also performed and recorded with Dave Newton, Didier Lockwood and Spike Robinson.

In 1991, Green was a founding member of Charlie Watts's quintet, together with Gerard Presencer, Peter King and Brian Lemon.

Since 1998, Green has led a trio featuring Iain Dixon and Gene Calderazzo, and since 2009, he has been a member of The ABC&D of Boogie Woogie, with Ben Waters, Axel Zwingenberger and Charlie Watts, performing at the Lincoln Center with Bob Seeley and Lila Ammons.

Discography

As leader/co-leader
1979: Fingers Remembers Mingus – Fingers
2001: Time Will Tell
2011: Turn Left at Monday
2012: The ABC&D of Boogie Woogie – live in Paris
2022: Raise Four (Trio Records, recorded 2004)

As sideman
1966: John Handy's Quintet – Captain John Handy
1970: Webster's Dictionary – Ben Webster
1974: Swinging Scorpio – Buddy Tate
1980: Primrose Path - Jimmy Knepper
1983: East 34th Street – Peter King
1984: London Reprise – Spike Robinson
1987: Playing in the Yard – Stan Tracey
1992: And Heaven Too – Ken Peplowski
1992: At Sundown – Acker Bilk and Humphrey Lyttelton
1992: Portraits Plus – Stan Tracey
1993: Some Other Spring – Tony Coe
1993: Some Other Autumn – Tony Coe
1993: East of the Sun – Scott Hamilton
1995: A Man and His Music – Bob Wilber
1995: How Long Has This Been Going On? – Roy Williams
1995: The Hamburg Concert – Bob Wilber
1995: But Beautiful – Brian Lemon
1996: Braff Plays Wimbledon – Ruby Braff
1996: First Moves – John Critchinson
1997: Days of Wine and Roses – Tony Coe
1997: Dave Cliff and Friends – When Lights Are Low – Dave Cliff
1998: With Every Breath – Joe Temperley
1998: Coxhill on Organ – Lol Coxhill
2002: A Special Alliance – John Bunch
2011: The Girl with Brown Hair – Dick Morrissey and the Michael Garrick Trio

References

External links

1942 births
Living people
21st-century British male musicians
21st-century double-bassists
British jazz double-bassists
British male jazz musicians
Male double-bassists